South Amboy is a station on NJ Transit's North Jersey Coast Line located in South Amboy, New Jersey, United States. Electric trains from the north started terminating here in 1938, and many still do. This station is located at grade level on Mason Street, and has a high-level island platform serving two tracks.

History

South Amboy station was upgraded to be fully compliant with the Americans with Disabilities Act of 1990 as part of a station renovation project from November 2006 to January 5, 2010. During the first phase of the project, a new $4.8 million pedestrian overpass was constructed, allowing safe transfers across the two tracks at the station. The overpass opened on March 11, 2005. The second phase of the project replaced the two original low-level side platforms with a new ADA-accessible high-level island platform, and reconstructed the station building. 
The station received a new ticket office, canopies, signage, and lighting. The second phase cost $29 million, and was completed on January 5, 2010.

Station layout
This station has two tracks and a high-level island platform, and is fully ADA-accessible. The station had a third track, but it was removed during the station renovation project.

References

External links

 Entrance from Google Maps Street View
 Station House from Google Maps Street View

South Amboy, New Jersey
NJ Transit Rail Operations stations
Railway stations in Middlesex County, New Jersey
Former New York and Long Branch Railroad stations